Gillotia is a genus of European non-biting midges in the subfamily Chironominae of the bloodworm family Chironomidae.

Species
G. alboviridis (Malloch, 1915)

References

Chironomidae
Diptera of Europe
Taxa named by Jean-Jacques Kieffer